The 2018 Speaker of the Lebanese Parliament election was the 6th legislative speaker election since the implementation of the Taif Agreement, held on 23 May 2018 during the first session of the 23rd parliament. The incumbent Speaker Nabih Berri and head of the Amal Movement was re-elected to a sixth term.

Under the article 44 of the constitution, the speaker is elected at the start of each parliamentary cycle by an absolute majority of the deputies' vote. By convention, the person is always a Shia Muslim.

Berri won the majority of the votes cast, receiving 98 votes and 76.5% out of 128 deputies.

See also 

 2018 Lebanese general election

References 

Lebanese legislative speaker elections
2018 in Lebanon
Nabih Berri
May 2018 events in Lebanon